Tirso Neri was the first mayor of the Cagayan de Misamis. He featured prominently as a revolutionary leader during the Philippine revolution. He opened the streets around the present Divisoria. He served as mayor from 1901 to 1903.

References

HISTORY OF CAGAYAN DE ORO CITY By Atty. “Tommy C Pacana

Mayors of Cagayan de Oro